Sanjiadian railway station is a railway station in Mentougou District, Beijing on the Fengtai–Shacheng railway, Beijing–Mentougou railway and Beijing Northwest Ring railway. It was opened in 1907.

Future development 
A commuter rail service on Beijing–Mentougou railway plans to renovate Sanjiadian railway station.

References 

Railway stations in Beijing
Railway stations in China opened in 1907